Qadam-e-Rasul (Arabic: قدم الرسول) (English: Footprint of the Messenger) is a type of veneration of Muhammad.  It comes from the belief started early in Islam that when Muhammad stepped on a rock his footprint left an imprint.  This belief was never accepted by orthodox brands of Islam; however, the idea was disseminated widely and led to the creation of many shrines around such imprints.  Some examples are the Shrine of the Holy Footprint in Delhi and in Cuttack in India and the displays in the Topkapı Palace and the Eyüp Sultan Mosque at Istanbul.

References 

Muhammad
Religious iconography
Islamic terminology